Syamsundarpur is a village in Chakulia community development block in East Singhbhum district of Jharkhand, India. Nearby places are Baharagora and Dhalbhumgar.

Demographics
As per 2011 Census of India, Shyam Sunderpur had a total population of 353 of which 185 (52%) were males and 168 (48%) were females. Population below age 6 was 29. The total number of literates in Shyam Sunderpur was 219 (67.59% of the population over age 6 ).

Sanskrit as a native language

Indian newspapers have published reports about Shyamsundarpur village (in Odisha), where a large parts of the population, including children, use Sanskrit as a native language in everyday communication.

References 

Villages in East Singhbhum district